The 2010 World Field Archery Championships were held in Visegrád, Hungary.

Medal summary (Men's individual)

Medal summary (Women's individual)

Medal summary (Men's Team)

Medal summary (Women's Team)

Medal summary (Men's Juniors)

Medal summary (Women's Juniors)

Medal summary (Junior Men's Team)

Medal summary (Junior Women's Team)

References

E
2010 in Hungarian sport
International sports competitions hosted by Hungary 
Archery competitions in Hungary
World Field Archery Championships